Benabid may refer to:
Beniabid or Benabid, a village in Iran

People with the surname
Alim-Louis Benabid, French neurosurgeon and medical researcher